Emmanuel Akah (born February 8, 1979) is a British-American offensive lineman of American football who is currently a free agent. He played college football for State University of New York at Canton and Winston-Salem State University.

Akah was born in London, England and attended Tottenville High School in Staten Island, New York. He is of Nigerian descent and lived in Nigeria from ages 6 to 8.

In 2006, Akah played for the Rhein Fire and Frankfurt Galaxy of NFL Europa. In 2007, he played with the Galaxy and spent time on the practice squad of the Kansas City Chiefs of the National Football League. The 6'3" and 330 pounds Akah has played in the preseason games with the Denver Broncos and the Miami Dolphins, also started in the preseason game of Denver Broncos vs Arizona Cardinals.

References

External links
WSS Bio

1979 births
Living people
Black British sportsmen
American football offensive guards
English people of Nigerian descent
English emigrants to the United States
Frankfurt Galaxy players
Kansas City Chiefs players
Sportspeople from London
Sportspeople from Staten Island
Players of American football from New York City
State University of New York at Canton alumni
Rhein Fire players
Tampa Bay Storm players
Winston-Salem State Rams football players
English players of American football
San Jose SaberCats players
San Antonio Talons players
Jacksonville Sharks players